James Farr is an American animator and animation director.

James Farr may also refer to:
 James M. Farr, American university professor and academic administrator
 James Farr (basketball), American basketball player
 Jim Farr, Major League Baseball pitcher

See also
 Jamie Farr, American television and film comedian and theatre actor